The Baloch or Baluch are a Western Iranic ethnic group, who are native to the Balochistan region of South and Western Asia encompassing the countries of Pakistan, Iran, and Afghanistan. There are also Baloch diaspora communities in neighbouring regions, including in Central Asia, and the Arabian Peninsula.

The Baloch people mainly speak Balochi or Brahui, despite their contrasting location on the southeastern side of the Persosphere. The majority of Baloch reside within Pakistan. About 50% of the total ethnic Baloch population live in the Pakistani province of Balochistan, while 40% are settled in Sindh and a significant albeit smaller number reside in Pakistani Punjab. They make up nearly 3.6% of Pakistan's total population, and around 2% of the populations of both Iran and Afghanistan.

Etymology
The exact origin of the word 'Baloch' is unclear.

 Rawlinson (1873) believed that it is derived from the name of the Babylonian king and god Belus. 
 Dames (1904) believed that it is derived from the Persian term for cockscomb, said to have been used as a crest on the helmets of Baloch troops in 6th century BCE. 
 Herzfeld (1968) proposed that it is derived from the Median term brza-vaciya, which describes a loud or aggressive way of speaking.
 Naseer Dashti (2012) presents another possibility, that of being derived from the name of the ethnic group 'Balaschik' living in Balasagan, between the Caspian Sea and Lake Van in present-day Turkey and Azerbaijan, who are believed to have migrated to Balochistan during the Sasanian times. The remnants of the original name such as 'Balochuk' and 'Balochiki' are said to be still used as ethnic names in Balochistan.

Some writers suggest a derivation from Sanskrit words bal, meaning strength, and och meaning high or magnificent. An earliest Sanskrit reference to the Baloch might be the Gwalior inscription of the Gurjara-Pratihara ruler Mihira Bhoja (r. 836–885), which says that the dynasty's founder Nagabhata I repelled a powerful army of Valacha Mlecchas, translated as "Baluch foreigners" by D. R. Bhandarkar. The army in question is that of the Umayyad Caliphate after the conquest of Sindh.

History

According to Baloch lore, their ancestors hail from Aleppo in what is now Syria. They claim to be descendants of Ameer Hamza, uncle of the Islamic prophet Muhammad, who settled in Halab (present-day Aleppo). After the fight against second Umayyad Caliph Yazid I at Karbala (in which Ameer Hamza's descendants supported and fought alongside Husayn ibn Ali) in 680, descendants of Ameer Hamza migrated to east or southeast of the central Caspian region, specially toward Sistan, Iran.

Dayaram Gidumal writes that a Balochi legend is backed up by the medieval Qarmatians. The fact that the Karmatians were ethnic Baluchis is also confirmed by the Persian historian in the 16th century Muhammad Qasim Ferishta. According to another historian Ali Sher Kanei, the author of Tuhfatul Kiram, in his history written in 1774 A.D, he believes that only the Rind tribe from Jalal Khan, a descendant of Muhammad ibn Harun, nicknamed Makurani, is a direct descendant of Hamza. Based on an analysis of the linguistic connections of the Balochi language, which is one of the Western Iranian languages, the original homeland of the Balochi tribes was likely to the east or southeast of the central Caspian region. The Baloch began migrating towards the east in the late Sasanian period. The cause of the migration is unknown but may have been as a result of the generally unstable conditions in the Caspian area. The migrations occurred over several centuries.

By the 9th century, Arab writers refer to the Baloch as living in the area between Kerman, Khorasan, Sistan, and Makran in what is now eastern Iran. Although they kept flocks of sheep, the Baloches also engaged in plundering travelers on the desert routes. This brought them into conflict with the Buyids, and later the Ghaznavids and the Seljuqs. Adud al-Dawla of the Buyid dynasty launched a punitive campaign against them and defeated them in 971–972. After this, the Baloch continued their eastward migration towards what is now the Balochistan province of Pakistan, although some remained behind and there are still Baloch in the eastern parts of the Iranian Sistan-Baluchestan and Kerman provinces. By the 13th–14th centuries, waves of Baloch were moving into Sindh, and by the 15th century into the Punjab. According to Dr. Akhtar Baloch, professor at University of Karachi, the Balochis migrated from Balochistan during the Little Ice Age and settled in Sindh and Punjab. The Little Ice Age is conventionally defined as a period extending from the sixteenth to the nineteenth centuries, or alternatively, from about 1300 to about 1850. although climatologists and historians working with local records no longer expect to agree on either the start or end dates of this period, which varied according to local conditions. According to Professor Baloch, the climate of Balochistan was very cold and the region was not inhabitable during the winter so the Baloch people migrated in waves and settled in Sindh and Punjab.
The area where the Baloch tribes settled was disputed between the Persian Safavids and the Mughal emperors. Although the Mughals managed to establish some control over the eastern parts of the area, by the 17th century, a tribal leader named Mir Hasan established himself as the first "Khan of the Baloch". In 1666, he was succeeded by Mir Aḥmad Khan Qambarani who established the Balochi Khanate of Kalat under the Ahmadzai dynasty. Originally in alliance with the Mughals, the Khanate lost its autonomy in 1839 with the signing of a treaty with the British colonial government and the region effectively became part of the British Raj.

Baloch culture

Gold ornaments such as necklaces and bracelets are an important aspect of Baloch women's traditions and among their most favoured items of jewellery are dorr, heavy earrings that are fastened to the head with gold chains so that the heavy weight will not cause harm to the ears. They usually wear a gold brooch (tasni) that is made by local jewellers in different shapes and sizes and is used to fasten the two parts of the dress together over the chest. In ancient times, especially during the pre-Islamic era, it was common for Baloch women to perform dances and sing folk songs at different events. The tradition of a Baloch mother singing lullabies to her children has played an important role in the transfer of knowledge from generation to generation since ancient times. Apart from the dressing style of the Baloch, indigenous and local traditions and customs are also of great importance to the Baloch.

Baloch Culture Day is celebrated by the Balochi people annually on 2 March with festivities to celebrate their rich culture and history.

Baloch tribes

Tradition

Traditionally, Jalal Khan was the ruler and founder of the first Balochi confederacy in 12th century. (He may be the same as Jalal ad-Din Mingburnu the last ruler of the Khwarezmian Empire.) Jalal Khan left four sons – Rind Khan, Lashar Khan, Hoth Khan, Korai Khan and a daughter, Bibi Jato, who married his nephew Murad.

Divisions
As of 2008 it was estimated that there were between eight and nine million Baloch people living in Afghanistan, Iran and Pakistan. They were subdivided between over 130 tribes. Some estimates put the figure at over 150 tribes, though estimates vary depending on how subtribes are counted. The tribes, known as taman, are led by a tribal chief, the tumandar. Subtribes, known as paras, are led by a muqaddam.

Five Baloch tribes derive their names from Khan's children. Many, if not all, Baloch tribes can be categorized as either Rind or Lashari based on their actual descent or historical tribal allegiances that developed into cross-generational relationships. This basic division was accentuated by a war lasting 30 years between the Rind and Lashari tribes in the 15th century.

Pakistan
There are 180,000 Bugti based in Dera Bugti District. They are divided between the Rahija Bugti, Masori Bugti, Kalpar Bugti, Marehta Bugti and other sub-tribes.

Nawab Akbar Khan Bugti led the Bugti as Tumandar until his death in 2006. Talal Akbar Bugti was the tribal leader and President of the Jamhoori Watan Party from 2006 until his death in 2015.

There are 98,000 Marri based in Kohlo district, who further divide themselves into Gazni Marri, Bejarani Marri, and Zarkon Marri.

Tribalism
Violent intertribal competition has prevented any credible attempt at creating a nation-state. A myriad of militant secessionist movements, each loyal to their own tribal leader, threatens regional security and political stability.

Balochs of African descent 
 

Some communities of Afro-Iranians identify themselves as Baloch. In parts of Balochistan, the term Darzada is used to denote people of mixed African and local heritage, while Ghulam or Nukar are more direct terms and imply a slave origin.

The Sheedi community in Pakistan, particularly those residing in Balochistan's Makran widely identity as Baloch and tend to vote for Baloch nationalist parties. In Sindh, the Sheedis are mostly concentrated in the Lyari town of Karachi who have also widely assimilated into Baloch culture and speak the Balochi language, albeit tinged Swahili words.

Genetics 
For most Balochs, haplogroup R1a is the most common paternal clade, while haplogroup L-M20 is the most common paternal clade in Makran.

Religion

The majority of the Baloch people in Pakistan are Sunni Muslims, with 64.78% belonging to the Deobandi movement, 33.38% to the Barelvi movement, and 1.25% to the Ahl-i Hadith movement. Shia Muslims comprise 0.59% of Balochs. Although Baloch leaders, backed by traditional scholarship, have held that the Baloch people are secular, Christine Fair and Ali Hamza found during their 2017 study that, when it comes to Islamism, "contrary to the conventional wisdom, Baloch are generally indistinguishable from other Pakistanis in Balochistan or the rest of Pakistan". There are virtually no statistically significant or substantive differences between Balochi Muslims and other Muslims in Pakistan in terms of religiosity, support for a sharia-compliant Pakistan state, liberating Muslims from oppression, etc.

800,000 Pakistani Balochis are estimated to follow the Zikri sect.

A small number of Balochs are non-Muslims, particularly in the Bugti clan which has Hindu and Sikh members. There are Hindu Balochs in the Bugti, Marri, Rind, Bezenjo, Zehri, Mengal and other Baloch tribes. The Bhagnaris are a Hindu Baloch community living in India who trace their origin to southern Balochistan but migrated to India during the Partition.

Baloch people from Pakistan
 Mir Jafar Khan Jamali, a veteran politician from Muslim League and a tribal leader from Balochistan. He was a close friend of Quaid-e-Azam Muhammad Ali Jinnah.
 Mir Chakar Rind, Baloch folk hero (1468-1565).
 Zafarullah Khan Jamali, the 15th prime minister of Pakistan.
 Asif Ali Zardari, the 11th president of Pakistan.
 Nabi Bakhsh Baloch, research scholar, historian, educationist and linguist in Urdu, English, Persian and Sindhi languages.
 Mir Hazar Khan Khoso, jurist and caretaker prime minister of Pakistan from 25 March to 5 June 2013. 
 Asif Saeed Khan Khosa, the 26th chief justice of Pakistan.
 Sardar Usman Buzdar, the current chief minister of Punjab province.
 Shireen Mazari, the federal minister for human rights and a member of Pakistan Tehreek-e-Insaf.
 Quratulain Balouch, Pakistani American singer and songwriter.
 Abdul Rashid Ghazi, Pakistani Diplomat and Religious Cleric.
 Farooq Leghari, the 8th president of Pakistan.
 Maulana Muhammad Abdullah, Islamic scholar who served as Chairman of Ruet-e-Hilal Committee.
 Sardar Mohammad Ayub Khan Gadhi, a Member of the Provincial Assembly and Ex-Minister for Counter Terrorism Punjab. 
 Kiran Maqsood Baluch, a Pakistani women cricketer.
Maulana Abdul Aziz, Imam of Red Mosque
 Aftab Baloch, a former Pakistani cricketer.
 Zulfiqar Ali Khosa, a former governor of Punjab province.
 Mir Hazar Khan Khoso, a former Chief Justice of the Federal Shariat Court of Pakistan.
 Latif Khosa, a former Governor of Punjab.
 Muhammad Muqeem Khan Khoso, a former Chief Sardar of the Khoso Tribe and former Member of the Provincial Assembly from PS-14 Jacobabad.
 Sarfraz Bugti, a former home minister of Balochistan. Currently a member of the senate.
 Abdul Quddus Bizenjo, the current chief minister of Balochistan.
 Sanaullah Khan Zehri, the 15th chief minister of Balochistan.
 Siraj Raisani, a member of Balochistan Awami Party. He is also a recipient of the Sitara-e-Shujaat (star of bravery).
 Sherbaz Khan Mazari, a Baluch veteran politician.
 Sardar Mir Balakh Sher Mazari, the interim prime minister of Pakistan in a 1993 caretaker government.
 Abdul Qadir Baloch, a retired General in the Pakistan army. Currently a Pakistani politician.
 Khair Bakhsh Marri was a Baloch politician from the province of Balochistan in Pakistan.
Akbar Bugti, the former Tumandar of the Bugti tribe and Minister of State of Balochistan Province.
Muniba Mazari, human rights activist, artist and motivational speaker.
Yasir Nawaz, director, producer, screenwriter and actor.
Naz Baloch, Pakistani female politician.
Danish Nawaz, television actor, director and comedian.
Mahnoor Baloch, Canadian Pakistani actress.

Eva B, hip hop rapper and singer.
Bilal Lashari, Pakistani filmmaker, cinematographer, screenwriter and actor.
Kaifi Khalil, singer-songwriter.
Hasnain Lehri, Pakistani actor and model.
Yusuf Baluch, Climate and human rights activist.

See also
 Baloch people in the United Arab Emirates
 Baloch of Turkmenistan
 Insurgency in Balochistan
 Al Balushi
 Balochi cuisine
 Indo-Iranian peoples
 Baloch nationalism
 1898 Baloch uprising
 Baloch people in Punjab
 Baloch people in Sindh

Notes

References

Bibliography

Further reading

External links

 Iran. The World Factbook. Central Intelligence Agency.
 
 

 
Iranian ethnic groups
Social groups of Balochistan, Pakistan
Social groups of Khyber Pakhtunkhwa
Ethnic groups in Afghanistan
Ethnic groups in Oman
Ethnic groups in Pakistan
Ethnic groups in Iran
Ethnic groups in South Asia
Ethnic groups in the Middle East
Nimruz Province
Sistan and Baluchestan Province
Ethnic groups divided by international borders
Baloch culture